Houayxay (also Huoeisay, Houei Sai or Huay Xai), is a district in Bokeo Province, Laos, on the border with Thailand. Ban Houayxay is the administrative centre of the district.

The town lies on the Mekong River opposite Chiang Khong in Thailand. The Fourth Thai-Lao Friendship Bridge at Ban Houayxay, which opened in December 2013 and replaced ferry service across the river, is now the northernmost road border crossing between the two countries. Asian Highway 3, which runs through Ban Houayxay, extends north to Yunnan Province of China and south to Chiang Rai Province of Thailand.

Houayxay has a domestic airport (HOE) with regular flights to Vientiane and Luang Prabang (depending on the season). Boats (speed and slow boats, freighters, luxury cruisers for tourists and others) run down the Mekong to Pakbeng, Luang Prabang and other destinations.

Fort Carnot, an ancient French fort in ruins, sits on a hill overlooking the town and the Mekong River.

Climate

References

External links

Laos–Thailand border crossings
Populated places on the Mekong River
Populated places in Bokeo Province